Vinnukum Mannukum is a 2001 Indian Tamil-language romantic comedy film directed by Rajakumaran. It stars  Sarathkumar, Vikram, Khushbu and Devayani. It was failure commercially.

Plot
Sakthivel (Sarathkumar) is the leader of his village in Coimbatore and is always adored by the people. His younger brother is Selvam (Vikram), who returns after completing his education in Singapore. Both Sakthivel and his wife Lakshmi (Khushbu Sundar) are very fond of Selvam and want him to get married and live happily. Selvam is keen on marrying a girl that he has seen in his dream. Sakthivel is prepared to go anywhere to find the girl. Selvam actually comes across the photograph of his dream girl Devayani (Devayani) in a TV advertisement and discovers that she is an actress. A film crew lands in the village for shooting, and Devayani, as she is called in the film too, is in the group. Sakthivel approaches her with his brother's proposal, but she insults him. She tells him that she is beautiful and famous and cannot marry a villager. Does Selvam accept defeat or manage to bring her round forms the remaining story.

Cast

 Sarathkumar as Sakthivel
 Vikram as Selvam
 Khushbu as Lakshmi
 Devayani as Devayani
 Sukumari as Devayani's mother
 Mayilsamy as Associate Director
 Ramesh Khanna
 Rami Reddy
 Singamuthu
 Rathan
 Kumaresan
 Abbas (cameo)
 Vikraman (cameo)
 Agathiyan (cameo)
 M. N. Nambiar (cameo)

Production
After the success of Nee Varuvai Ena, Rajakumaran was given another chance by R. B. Choudary to make a film under his banner. The project was titled as Vinnukkum Mannukkum. Vikram was selected after the success of his previous film Sethu. To ensure success in rural areas, Choudhary selected his lucky mascot Sarathkumar for eighth time in the film.

Sarathkumar chose to be a part of the film after two of his other films became suddenly postponed. He had cut his hair short for Maayi (2000), and as the other films required different hairstyles, the producers had pushed back the dates. To make most of the lost time, Sarathkumar agreed to portray an extended guest role in Vinnukum Mannukum.

A shooting schedule took place at the AVM Studios in Chennai, where Vikram celebrated his birthday on the sets, with the unit members and Sharat Kumar. In an interview to Hindu in 2008, Vikram has mentioned his displeasure at being a part of the film, claiming that he had arguments with the director for every single shot and that "everything in that film, right from the first shot was wrong. From the beginning, the film was considered a certain Deepavali release. But the director Rajakumaran failed to utilize the call sheets of Sarathkumar to optimum use. Sarath got wild because of this. He too caused some delay in finishing off the shootings." Rajakumaran dragged and finished the film in two years causing delay.

The film created a hype and sensation in media due to the marriage of Devayani and the film's director Rajakumaran.

Soundtrack
The music was composed by Sirpy.

Release
RB Choudhary incurred huge loss through this film and dubbed film Paapa later he gained profits through films like Aanandham and Samudhiram, both films starring actor Murali.

Critical reception
The film received positive reviews. The Hindu wrote:"Director Rajakumaran has taken special care in the choice of songs and locations to make the film entertaining. He should have paid more attention to the first half and more important, must have extracted more work from Vikram, who has the potential, and Devayani, for whom it is a cakewalk".

References

External links 
 

2001 films
2000s Tamil-language films
Films scored by Sirpy
Indian romance films
2000s romance films
Super Good Films films